The 2014 Giro del Trentino is the 38th edition of the Giro del Trentino cycling stage race. It started on 22 April in Riva del Garda and will end on 25 April on the top of Monte Bondone. The race will consist of four stages; it started with a team time trial on the same route of the first stage in the 2012 edition of the race, and will end on Monte Bondone for the queen stage. The race was part of the 2014 UCI Europe Tour, and was rated as a 2.HC event.

Australian rider Cadel Evans of  won the General Classification, claiming the leader's jersey in second stage (won by the Italian Edoardo Zardini), and securing his lead by winning the third. Colombian Leonardo Duque won the red jersey of the Intermediate Sprints Classification, Jonathan Monsalve of Venezuela won the King of the Mountains Classification and South African Louis Meintjes finished first in the Young Rider Classification.  won the Teams Classification.

Race overview
The race was officially presented on 14 April in Trento.

Teams
The start list includes 16 teams. Among the riders, pre-race favourites were Cadel Evans, Michele Scarponi and Bradley Wiggins; other notable riders who are taking part in the race are Domenico Pozzovivo, Ivan Basso, Franco Pellizotti, Giovanni Visconti, Luis León Sánchez and Moreno Moser. The defending champion Vincenzo Nibali did not participate in the race.

ProTeams

 
 
 
 
 
 
 

Professional Continental Teams

Stages

Stage 1
22 April 2014 — Riva del Garda to Arco,  team time trial (TTT)

Stage 2
23 April 2014 — Limone sul Garda to San Giacomo di Brentonico,

Stage 3
24 April 2014 — Mori to Roncone,

Stage 4
25 April 2014 — Val Daone to Monte Bondone,

Classification leadership table

References

External links

Giro del Trentino
Giro del Trentino
2014